The Cortland Red Dragons (also known as the SUNY Cortland Red Dragons or the Cortland State Red Dragons) are composed of 23 teams representing the State University of New York at Cortland in intercollegiate athletics, including men and women's basketball, cross country, ice hockey, lacrosse, soccer, swimming & diving, and track and field. Men's sports include baseball, football, and wrestling. Women's sports include field hockey, golf, gymnastics, volleyball, tennis, and softball. The Red Dragons compete in the NCAA Division III and are members of the State University of New York Athletic Conference for most sports, except for the football team, which competes in the Empire 8 Athletic Conference.

Teams

National championships

Team

Baseball
Cortland has had nine Major League Baseball Draft selections since the draft began in 1965.

Football

References

External links